Jean-Paul Emorine (born 20 March 1944) is a former member of the Senate of France, representing the Saône-et-Loire department. He is a member of the Union for a Popular Movement.

References
Page on the Senate website 

1944 births
Living people
Union for a Popular Movement politicians
French Senators of the Fifth Republic
Senators of Saône-et-Loire